Zgornje Bitnje is a settlement just south of Kranj in the Upper Carniola region of Slovenia.

Church

The local church is dedicated to Saint Thomas.

References

External links

Zgornje Bitnje on Geopedia

Populated places in the City Municipality of Kranj